Johann Abraham Ihle (14 June 1627 – c.1699) was a German amateur astronomer who discovered the first known globular cluster, M22, on 26 August 1665 while observing Saturn in Sagittarius.

References

17th-century German astronomers
1627 births
1699 deaths